Zarinah Abdullah (born 12 July 1971) is a retired badminton player notable for being the first female professional badminton player in Singapore. She was considered Singapore's top badminton player in the 1990s and represented the country in the 1992 and 1996 Summer Olympics.

Career 
Zarinah started playing badminton at the age of 12. While studying at Outram Institute, she competed in the national championships. As of February 1990, she was Singapore's national women's champion for two years. She subsequently quit her pre-university studies to become a full-time badminton player.

Zarinah participated in the 1992 and 1996 Summer Olympics in the women's singles event. She achieved her highest world ranking of seven in July 1993 and her highest World Grand Prix ranking of three in January 1994.

Awards 
Zarinah received the 1993 and 1994 Meritorious Award from the Singapore National Olympic Committee.

Achievements

Southeast Asian Games 
Women's singles

IBF International 
Women's singles

References

External links 
 

1971 births
Living people
Singaporean female badminton players
Badminton players at the 1992 Summer Olympics
Badminton players at the 1996 Summer Olympics
Olympic badminton players of Singapore
Badminton players at the 1994 Asian Games
Asian Games competitors for Singapore
Badminton players at the 1994 Commonwealth Games
Badminton players at the 1998 Commonwealth Games
Commonwealth Games competitors for Singapore
Competitors at the 1989 Southeast Asian Games
Competitors at the 1991 Southeast Asian Games
Competitors at the 1993 Southeast Asian Games
Competitors at the 1995 Southeast Asian Games
Competitors at the 1997 Southeast Asian Games
Southeast Asian Games bronze medalists for Singapore
Southeast Asian Games medalists in badminton